
Gmina Daleszyce is an urban-rural gmina (administrative district) in Kielce County, Świętokrzyskie Voivodeship, in south-central Poland.

The gmina contains part of the protected area called Cisów-Orłowiny Landscape Park.

Villages
Apart from the town of Daleszyce, Gmina Daleszyce contains the villages and settlements of Borków, Brzechów, Cisów, Danków, Komórki, Kranów, Marzysz, Mójcza, Niestachów, Niwy, Sieraków, Słopiec, Smyków, Suków, Szczecno, Trzemosna and Widełki.

Neighbouring gminas
Gmina Daleszyce is bordered by the city of Kielce and by the gminas of Bieliny, Górno, Łagów, Morawica, Pierzchnica and Raków.

References
Polish official population figures 2006

Daleszyce
Kielce County